The IAP Meteorological Tower is a  guyed tower for meteorological measurements, studies of air pollution and studies of the atmospheric boundary layer in Beijing, China. It is one of the tallest of its kind in the world and was at time of completion in August 1979 the tallest man-made structure in China.

External links 
 http://english.cas.cn/newsroom/mutimedia_news/201510/t20151010_153343.shtml
 http://skyscraperpage.com/diagrams/?buildingID=109836

Buildings and structures in Beijing
Towers in China